Cyperus schweinitzii is a species of sedge that is native to parts of North America.

See also 
 List of Cyperus species

References 

schweinitzii
Plants described in 1836
Flora of Mexico
Flora of Canada
Flora of Colorado
Flora of Illinois
Flora of Indiana
Flora of Iowa
Flora of Kentucky
Flora of Missouri
Flora of Montana
Flora of New Mexico
Flora of South Dakota
Flora of Texas
Flora of Utah
Flora of Wyoming
Taxa named by John Torrey
Flora without expected TNC conservation status